Dewas tehsil is a tehsil in Dewas district, Madhya Pradesh, India. It is also a subdivision of the administrative and revenue division of bhopal district of Madhya Pradesh.

Demographics

References 

Tehsils of Madhya Pradesh
Dewas district